Staro Lagovo is a village in Municipality of Prilep, North Macedonia. Till 1912 it was just known as Lagovo.

Demographics
According to the 2002 census, the village had a total of 38 inhabitants. Ethnic groups in the village include:

Macedonians 38

References

Villages in Prilep Municipality